Greenbank railway station serves the village of Hartford, Cheshire as well as the Greenbank and Castle areas of Northwich, Cheshire, England. The station is situated on the A559 road from Northwich to Chester.

History

The station was built by the West Cheshire Railway, a constituent of the Cheshire Lines Committee (CLC) and opened to passengers on 22 June 1870. The CLC continued to operate both goods and passenger services from the station, unaffected by the railway grouping of 1923, until the railway nationalisation of 1948. The station name was Hartford and Greenbank until 7 May 1973 when British Railways renamed the station Greenbank, to avoid confusion with the nearby  station on the West Coast Main Line.

CLC trains were headed by locomotives in LNER livery. A link to LMS service was made by a shuttle service to  using LMS stock (this normally continued via Northwich, Middlewich &  to ). This service was nicknamed "The Dodger", but was withdrawn in 1942.

As of the December 2008 timetable, there were two additional weekday peak services to and from Stockport. On Sundays, a two-hourly service to Chester and Manchester was introduced, with the latter continuing to Southport, via Wigan Wallgate and Bolton.
Prior to the new service, trains to Manchester had not operated on Sundays since the early 1990s. Passengers had to change at Altrincham on to the Manchester Metrolink to continue their journeys. 

Services beyond Manchester were terminated in the May 2010 timetable change, with all current trains now calling at Manchester Piccadilly and no further.  Additional weekday peak services to/from Stockport were suspended in 2020.

Facilities

The station is unstaffed (though there is a self-service ticket machine provided) and has a free car park. There is a public phone box opposite the station and a row of shops nearby. The main station buildings are on the north-west side of the line and are presently used as a Christian church. Waiting shelters are provided on each side and train running details are offered via digital CIS displays, telephone and timetable posters. Step-free access is provided to both platforms.

Hartford's main station is about one mile (1.6 km) to the west along the main A559 road - a 20-minute journey on foot or 5 minutes by car or taxi.  Trains are available from there to Liverpool Lime Street, Winsford,  and Birmingham New Street.

Services
The station gets one train per hour westbound to Chester and one train per hour eastbound to Manchester Piccadilly. 18 trains per day run to Chester, with 17 running towards Manchester. On Sundays, there is a two-hourly service each way, with 7 trains in each direction. The majority of services are run by Northern Class 150 trains, with some Class 156's also serving the station.

There have been repeated plans for a half-hourly service in each direction - it was a part of the 2015 franchise agreement - though this has been repeatedly delayed due to capacity constraints between Stockport and Manchester and is yet, as of January 2022, to be implemented.

Proposed future developments
As part of Northern's proposed December 2022 timetable (which focuses on additional services within the Manchester area), an additional 4 trains per day between Chester and Stockport (2 in each direction) have been proposed during peak hours on Mondays to Saturdays. These services are aimed at those who are commuting to and/or working in Manchester and Stockport. This change will increase the number of trains departing Chester on the line to 20 per day, with the number departing Stockport also increased to 20 per day. The 2 hourly Sunday service will remain the same, at 7 trains per day.

References

 Notes

Bibliography

Further reading

Gallery

External links

  Mid-Cheshire Community Rail Partnership

Railway stations in Cheshire
DfT Category F1 stations
Railway stations in Great Britain opened in 1870
Northwich
Former Cheshire Lines Committee stations
Northern franchise railway stations